Herbert Nigsch (born 2 December 1960) is an Austrian wrestler. He competed at the 1980 Summer Olympics and the 1984 Summer Olympics.

References

External links
 

1960 births
Living people
Austrian male sport wrestlers
Olympic wrestlers of Austria
Wrestlers at the 1980 Summer Olympics
Wrestlers at the 1984 Summer Olympics
People from Feldkirch, Vorarlberg
Sportspeople from Vorarlberg